Samuel Isaac Penwarden (July 19, 1885 – May 23, 1930) was a Canadian curler. He was the third of the 1928 Brier Champion team (skipped by Gordon Hudson), representing Manitoba. He died in 1930 of pneumonia.

References

Brier champions
1885 births
1930 deaths
Curlers from Winnipeg
Canadian male curlers